Dale Michael Chadwick (born 20 June 1989) is a South African rugby union footballer. His regular playing position is loosehead prop.

References

External links
 
 itsrugby.co.uk profile

1989 births
Living people
Rugby union players from Durban
Rugby union props
Sharks (Currie Cup) players
Sharks (rugby union) players
South African people of British descent
South African rugby union players
White South African people